Tribosphenomys is a genus of extinct rodent that lived during Late Paleocene of Northern China and Mongolia.

References

External links
Tribosphenomys minutus at Paleozoological Museum of China official website (Chinese)
Tribosphenomys at fossilworks

Paleocene rodents
Paleogene mammals of Asia
Fossils of China
Fossil taxa described in 1994